Eerie, Indiana: The Other Dimension is an American horror television series. It is a spin-off of Eerie, Indiana. This series aired on the Fox Kids Network in 1998.

Plot
The series revolves around best friends Mitchell Taylor and Stanley Hope. Like earlier Eerie, Indiana residents Marshall Teller and Simon Holmes, they are constantly encountering strange and out-of-this-world phenomena in their hometown. Bill Switzer played the lead character, Mitchell Taylor.

Cast
Bill Switzer as Mitchell Taylor
Daniel Clark as Stanley Hope
Deborah Odell as Mrs. Taylor
Lindy Booth as Carrie Taylor
Bruce Hunter as Edward Taylor
Neil Crone as Mr. Crawford

Development
In 1997, the earlier show Eerie, Indiana, generated a new fan base when Fox's children's programming block Fox Kids aired the series, gaining something of a cult following despite its short run. The renewed popularity of the series encouraged Fox to produce this spin-off.

Episodes

References

External links

Fox Broadcasting Company original programming
Global Television Network original programming
1990s American children's comedy television series
1990s American comic science fiction television series
1990s American horror comedy television series
1990s American mystery television series
1998 American television series debuts
1998 American television series endings
1990s Canadian children's television series
1990s Canadian comic science fiction television series
1998 Canadian television series debuts
1998 Canadian television series endings
American children's adventure television series
American children's fantasy television series
American children's horror television series
American children's mystery television series
Canadian children's adventure television series
Canadian children's fantasy television series
Canadian children's horror television series
Canadian children's mystery television series
Canadian television spin-offs
Television shows set in Indiana
American television spin-offs
Fox Kids
Canadian horror fiction television series
Television series by Corus Entertainment
Sandman in television
Television series about teenagers